Dan Sweeney may refer to:
 Dan Sweeney (baseball)
 Dan Sweeney (footballer)

See also
 D. B. Sweeney (Daniel Bernard Sweeney), American actor